40th meridian may refer to:

40th meridian east, a line of longitude east of the Greenwich Meridian
40th meridian west, a line of longitude west of the Greenwich Meridian